The Santiago Formation is a Sandbian to Katian geologic formation of central Bolivia. The formation comprises gray quartzitic siltstones.

Fossil content 
The formation has provided the following fossils:
 Bistramia sp.
 Lingula sp.
 Orthoceras sp.

See also 
 List of fossiliferous stratigraphic units in Bolivia

References

Further reading 
 R. Suárez Soruco. 1976. El sistema ordovícico en Bolivia. Revista Tecnica YPF Bolivia 5(2):111-123

Geologic formations of Bolivia
Ordovician System of South America
Ordovician Bolivia
Katian
Sandbian
Siltstone formations
Ordovician southern paleotemperate deposits
Paleontology in Bolivia
Formations